Jeffrey "Jeff" Rowe is an American film director and writer. He is known for his work as a writer on Gravity Falls and Disenchantment, as well as co-directing and co-writing the animated film The Mitchells vs. the Machines (2021). In June 2020, he was hired to direct Teenage Mutant Ninja Turtles: Mutant Mayhem.

Early life and education 
Rowe grew up in Hometown, Illinois, a suburb of Chicago. He attended the California Institute of the Arts and graduated in 2011.

Career 
Rowe briefly worked at Film Roman, Bento Box Entertainment, and Rubicon Group Holding, before serving as a writer on the Disney Channel animated series Gravity Falls where he stayed until the show's conclusion in 2016. He also wrote for the Netflix animated series, Disenchantment.

Rowe would later go on to co-direct and co-write The Mitchells vs. the Machines along with Mike Rianda. The film was released on Netflix on April 30, 2021. In June 2020, Rowe was hired to direct the upcoming film Teenage Mutant Ninja Turtles: Mutant Mayhem. It is currently scheduled to be released on August 4, 2023.

Filmography

Film

Television

Awards and nominations

References

External links 
 

Living people
Year of birth missing (living people)
American male screenwriters
American television writers
Animators from California
Sony Pictures Animation people
American animated film directors